York Comprehensive High School is the sole high school in York County School District 1.  Dr. John Tharpe serves as principal. The school is located in York, South Carolina.

Due to growth and aging of the original building, a new high school was built.  The new high school is on Alexander Love Highway.  The new campus will accommodate grades 9–12.  Ninth graders had been housed at York Junior High for several years because the old York Comprehensive was unable to handle the large number of students.  The new campus is designed to hold 1,800 students.

Sports, clubs, and activities
York Comprehensive athletes will compete in Region IIII–AAAA. Other schools in the region are:
Lancaster High School
Ridge View High School
Richland Northeast High School
South Pointe High School 
Westwood High School

York's arch rival in sports is the Clover High School Blue Eagles.  The rivalry is one of the oldest in the state.

 The school's women's basketball team won the 2001–2002 AAA state championship.
 The women's basketball team, also led by Latta was a runner-up in the 2002–2003 AAA state championship.

Controversy
In May 2015, the school became the center of a national controversy when it banned the act of flying large flags from vehicles on the school grounds. Soon after posts on social media, this ban got national attention, mostly due to the perception that this policy was an attack on the American flag itself. In response to peaceful protests and threats of litigation, the school reversed the flag ban, allowing the American flag to be flown on vehicles.

Notable alumni
 Josh Davis, NFL wide receiver
 Spencer Lanning, NFL punter
 Ivory Latta, WNBA player
 Beau Nunn, professional football player
 John Spratt, politician
 Charles Randolph-Wright, film, television, and theatre director; television producer, screenwriter, and playwright

References

External links
School website

Public high schools in South Carolina
Schools in York County, South Carolina